Nguyễn Ngọc Trường Sơn (born 23 February 1990) is a Vietnamese chess player. He is the youngest Vietnamese ever to become a Grandmaster, and one of the youngest grandmasters in the history of the game, having qualified for the title at the age of fourteen.

Chess career
Trường Sơn learned to play chess at the age of 3. He won a gold medal at the World Youth Championships in the Under 10 category in 2000.

In 2006 Trường Sơn won the Asian Junior (under 20) Championship in New Delhi, on tiebreak over Shiyam Sundar after they both finished on 7/9 points.

In August 2014, he, Lê Quang Liêm, and other Vietnamese chess players participated in 2014 Chess Olympiad in Tromsø, Norway. With +7=3-0 result, Nguyen Ngoc Truong Son won the gold medal on Board Two thanks to his rating performance of 2843.

He repeated this feat at the 2018 Chess Olympiad in Batumi, Georgia. Playing board 2, he again won the gold medal with an identical score of +7=3-0 for 8.5/10 and an Elo rating performance of 2804.

Career highlights 

1999: Bronze medal, Asia U-10 Chess Championship
2000: Gold medal, World U-10 Chess Championship. Second place, Vietnam's 'athlete of the year'
2001: Gold medalist at the Asia U-12 Chess Championship
September 2002: awarded International Master title
December 2004: awarded International Grandmaster title. Vietnam's 'athlete of the year'
December 2005: Individual Rapid and Standard Chess Champion, South East Asia Games 23, Philippines.
February 2010: 5th place in the Aeroflot Open 
July 2010: 2nd place in the Biel Chess Festival
June 2013: 5th place in World Blitz championship
March 2014: Winner of 4th HD Bank Cup (7/9, +5 =4)
August 2014: Board 2 Gold medal (8.5/10, +7 =3), achieving a performance rating of 2843 in the 41st Chess Olympiad.
September 2017: competed at Chess World Cup
September 2018: Board 2 Gold medal (8.5/10, +7 =3), achieving a performance rating of 2804 in the 43rd Chess Olympiad.

Personal life 
In April 2015, he married compatriot International Master Phạm Lê Thảo Nguyên.

References

External links
 
 
 

1990 births
Living people
Vietnamese chess players
Chess grandmasters
World Youth Chess Champions
People from Kiên Giang Province
Asian Games competitors for Vietnam
Chess players at the 2010 Asian Games
Southeast Asian Games medalists in chess
Southeast Asian Games gold medalists for Vietnam
Southeast Asian Games silver medalists for Vietnam
Southeast Asian Games bronze medalists for Vietnam
Competitors at the 2005 Southeast Asian Games
Competitors at the 2011 Southeast Asian Games
Competitors at the 2021 Southeast Asian Games
20th-century Vietnamese people
21st-century Vietnamese people